Glen Allen Whitten (February 24, 1936 – September 15, 2014) was an American diver. He competed in the men's 3 metre springboard event at the 1956 Summer Olympics.

References

External links
 
 

1936 births
2014 deaths
American male divers
Olympic divers of the United States
Divers at the 1956 Summer Olympics
Sportspeople from Lakeland, Florida